Leave Me Alone ("Ah, double in trouble" also, known as Ah ma yau nan) is a 2004 Hong Kong thriller film directed and co-written by Danny Pang. It stars Ekin Cheng in a dual role.

Plot
Gay fashion designer Yiu Chun Man (Ekin Cheng) is visited in Hong Kong by his straight twin brother, Yiu Chun Kit (also Ekin Cheng). Kit borrows his brother's driver's license, and is then involved in a car crash in which a woman dies, and Kit falls into a coma.

With no ID card, Man is unable to prove his identity, so he assumes the identity of his brother, and takes up with Kit's girlfriend, Jane, (Charlene Choi), and goes with her to Thailand. Jane, however, is having some money problems, and is deeply indebted to a loan shark (Dayo Wong), who pursues Man and Jane.

Kit comes out of his coma and finds himself struggling to fend off the amorous advances of Man's boyfriend (Jan Lamb), who is a high-ranking Hong Kong police officer.

Production and release
Linked by the same car accident, Leave Me Alone is a companion piece to Ab-normal Beauty, directed by Oxide Pang, which was also released in Hong Kong cinemas in November 2004.

Leave Me Alone was screened at the Deauville Asian Film Festival and the Tokyo International Film Festival.

It was released on DVD in Hong Kong (all region) by Universe Laser on 8 January 2005.

See also
Ab-normal Beauty

External links
 

2004 films
LGBT-related thriller films
2000s Cantonese-language films
2004 thriller films
Hong Kong LGBT-related films
Films directed by Danny Pang
Hong Kong thriller films

2004 LGBT-related films
2000s Hong Kong films